Newton and Haceby is a civil parish in North Kesteven, Lincolnshire, England. It includes the separate hamlets of Newton and Haceby. The population of the civil parish (including Walcot) at the 2011 census was 137. 

Local democracy is handled together with the adjacent parish of Walcot near Folkingham in the Newton, Haceby and Walcot Parish Meeting.

The parish is bounded on the north by the A52 Grantham to Boston road, and on the east by the A15 Bourne to Sleaford road. There are no major routes within the parish, only minor roads linking the farms and hamlets. A number of small woodlands are scattered through the parish, which is otherwise mostly open farmland.

References

External links

Civil parishes in Lincolnshire
North Kesteven District